The 2019 America East men's basketball tournament was the postseason men's basketball tournament for the America East Conference, which was held on March 9, 12, and 16, 2019. All tournament games were played on home arenas of the higher-seeded school. Vermont defeated UMBC 66–49 in the championship game and received the conference's automatic bid to the NCAA tournament. This was the seventh time Vermont has won the America East tournament championship, which ties them with former member Northeastern for the most all time.

Seeds
The top eight teams in the conference standings qualified for the tournament. The teams were seeded by record in conference, with a tiebreaker system to seed teams with identical conference records.

Schedule

Bracket and results
Teams are reseeded after each round with highest remaining seeds receiving home court advantage.

* denotes number of overtime periods

See also
 2019 America East women's basketball tournament

References

Tournament
America East Conference men's basketball tournament
2019 in sports in Vermont
Sports competitions in Burlington, Vermont
College basketball tournaments in Vermont